

List of ambassadors
$Michael Brodsky 2021-
Joel Lion 2018 -
Reuven Din El 2011 - 2014
Zina Kalay-Kleitman 2007 - 2011
Naomi Ben-Ami 2003 - 2007
Anna Azari 1999 - 2003
Ehud Eitam 1992 - 1993

References

Ukraine
Israel